A sun temple (or solar temple) is a building used for religious or spiritual activities, such as prayer and sacrifice, dedicated to the sun or a solar deity. Such temples were built by a number different cultures and are distributed around the world including in India, China, Egypt, Japan and Peru. Some of the temples are in ruins, undergoing excavation, preservation or restoration and a few are listed as World Heritage Sites individually or as part of a larger site, such as Konark.

China

The Temple of the Sun in Beijing, China, was built in 1530 during the Ming dynasty by the Jiajing Emperor, together with new temples dedicated to the Earth and the Moon, and an expansion of the Temple of Heaven. The Temple of the Sun was used by the imperial court for elaborate acts of worship involving fasting, prayers, dancing and animal sacrifices, as part of a year-long cycle of ceremonies involving all the temples. An important element was the colour red, which was associated with the Sun, including red utensils for food and wine offerings, and red clothes for the emperor to wear during the ceremonies. The temple is now part of a public park.

Egypt

In ancient Egypt, there were a number of sun temples. Among these old monuments is the Great Temple of Ramses at Abu Simbel, and complexes built by the Fifth Dynasty, of which only two examples survive, that of Userkaf and of Niuserre. The Fifth Dynasty temples usually had three components, a main temple building at a higher elevation, accessed by a causeway, from a much smaller entrance building. In 2006, archaeologists found ruins underneath a market in Cairo, which could possibly be the largest temple built by Ramesses II.

Indian subcontinent

The sun temples of the Indian subcontinent are dedicated to the Hindu deity Surya, with the most prominent among them being the Konark Sun Temple (also known as the Black Pagoda) -a UNESCO World Heritage Site. at Konark in Odisha and the Sun Temple at Modhera, Gujarat, built in 1026–1027.  Both are now ruins, having been destroyed by invading muslim armies.  Konark was constructed around 1250, by Narasimhadeva I of the Eastern Ganga Dynasty. Surya was an important deity in early Hinduism, but sun worship largely declined as a principal deity around the 12th century. In Manipuri mythology, the sun god Korouhanba is the synonym of the Hindu deity Surya. Other Surya or sun temples in the Indian subcontinent include:

 Andhra Pradesh 
 Surya Narayana Temple at Arasavalli in Andhra Pradesh built in 7th century by king Devendra Varma, ruler of Kalinga The temple is constructed in such a way that on the day of Radhasaptami, the Sun's rays directly fall on the feet of the Sri Suryanarayana Swami, the deity at the temple.

 Assam 
 Surya Pahar Temple at Sri Surya Pahar in Assam built in 9th century

 Bihar
 Deo Surya Mandir in Deo, Bihar
 Bhaskar Temple at Gaya in Bihar
 Bhaskar Temple at Parsa in Bihar
 Bhaskar Temple at Patna in Bihar
 Bhaskar Temple at Pitath
 Bhaskar Temple at Bhakura
 Bhaskar Chhth ghat, Selhauri in Belhauri
 Manjesh Bhaskar Temple at 
 Budha Bhaskar temple at Garhara
 Bhushan Bhaskar temple at Chain Singh Patti
 Bhagwan Bhaskar Dham at Kurmuri in Arrah
 Surya Temple at Sanda
 Sun Temple at Nalanda
 Sun Temple at Baragaon
 Sun Temple at Nur Sarai
 Sun Temple at Muzaffarpur
 Sun Temple at Beraunti
 Sun Temple at Chorsua
 Sun Temple at Beldhana
 Sun Temple at Koel Bigha
 Sun Temple at Sirnawan
 Sun Temple at Ben
 Sun Temple at Shankardih
 Sun Temple at Itasang
 Sun Temple at Kundi, Bihar
 Sun Temple at Alawan
 Sun Temple at Lal Bigha, Nawada
 Sun Temple at Soradih
 Sun Temple at Bilari

 Gujarat
 Modhera Sun Temple at Modhera in Gujarat, built in 1027 by King Bhimdev of the Chaulukya dynasty
 Navlakha Temple, Ghumli, Gujarat, built in the 11th century.

 Haryana
 Within 48 Kos Parikrama of Kurukshetra
 Within Borshyam Surya tirtha
 Within Aaugandh Suryakunda
 Within Habri Suryakunda
 Within Sajuma Suryakunda
 Surajkund, Faridabad

 Jammu and Kashmir 
 Martand Sun Temple, near Anantnag in Jammu and Kashmir built in 10th century

 Karnataka
 Soorya Narayana Temple at Maroli, Mangalore, Karnataka

 Kerala
 Adithyapuram Sun Temple

 Madhya Pradesh
 Bhramanya Dev Temple at Unao, Balaji in Madhya Pradesh
 Birla Sun Temple in Gwalior
 Madkhera Sun Temple:- Madkhera is a small village situated on the North-West of Tikamgarh town at a distance of about 20 km. The entrance of the Sun temple is from the east and the Sun idol is placed inside.

 Manipur
 Ebudhou Korouhanba Temple, Moidangpok, Patsoi, Manipur

 Odisha
 Biranchinarayan Temple, Palia, a 13th-century temple in Palia, Odisha.

 Tamil Nadu 
 Suryanar Kovil Temple at Kumbakonam in Tamil Nadu built in 1060-1118 CE

 Uttarakhand
 Sun temple at Katharmal, near Almora and 70 km from Nainital was built in 9th century CE by the Katyuri kings.** Sun temple at Katharmal, near Almora and 70 km from Nainital was built in 9th century CE by the Katyuri kings.

 Uttar Pradesh
 Rahila Sagar Sun Temple at Mahoba in Uttar Pradesh
 Sun Temple at Kalpi in Uttar Pradesh

 Pakistan 
 Multan Sun Temple, also known as Aditya Sun Temple, in Multan in Punjab, Pakistan was destroyed by Muslim rulers in 10th century.

Inca empire

The following are Pre-Columbian temples of Inti (the Inca god Sun):
Qurikancha in Cusco, Peru, was the most important temple in the Inca Empire.
Muyuq Marka in Cusco, Peru.
 Willkawaman in Vilcashuamán, Peru.

Others 
There are also sun temple sites in a number of other countries:
 The Temple of the Sun in the Temple of the Cross Complex, at the Mayan site of Palenque, in southern Mexico, built sometime between 200 and 900 AD.
 The Temple of the Night Sun at the Mayan site of El Zotz, Guatemala, possibly abandoned in the fifth century.
 There are several Shinto shrines in Japan, dedicated to the sun goddess Amaterasu including:
 Ise Grand Shrine in Ise, Mie prefecture
 Amanawa Shinmei Shrine, founded in 710, in Kamakura
 Amanoiwato-jinja in Takachiho, Miyazaki prefecture
 In the Mesa Verde National Park in Colorado, United States, there is a structure which may have been used as a sun temple by the Pueblo culture, with construction thought to have begun in 1275 AD, although it does not seem to have been completed.

Other usages 
The name Temple of the Sun or Sun Temple was given to a folly which stood in Kew Gardens from 1761 until 1916. It was designed and built by William Chambers, who also planted a cedar tree next to the structure earlier, in 1725. In 1916, a storm brought down the cedar tree, which destroyed the folly in the process.

See also 
 Fire temple
 Temple of the Moon (disambiguation)
 Temple of the Stars

References

 
Sun temple